Arkansas International Airport  is a public use airport located three nautical miles (6 km) northwest of the central business district of Blytheville, a city in Mississippi County, Arkansas, United States. It is owned by the Blytheville Gosnell Regional Airport Authority.

History
Arkansas International Airport was developed from the closed Eaker Air Force Base (formerly Blytheville Air Force Base), after its closure by the United States Air Force on 15 December 1992.

In 2008, Aviation Repair Technologies (ART) established its headquarters at the facility and opened repair facilities for aircraft heavy maintenance, short-term aircraft storage, and aircraft engine disassembly.
 The company's heavy maintenance activities are focused on regional turboprop and jet aircraft, including the ATR 72, ATR 42, CRJ 200, CRJ 700, CRJ 900, Embraer 120, ERJ 135, ERJ 145, ERJ 170, and ERJ 190 aircraft.
 Its aircraft engine disassembly operation, named Turbine Support International (TSI), is a joint venture between ART and Air France-KLM. TSI is focused on disassembly of CFM56, CF6-80, and CF6-50 engine types.
 Also located at the airport is an aircraft jet engine test cell that was constructed in 1991 by the US Air Force and is capable of testing engines that produce up to 56,000 lbs of thrust, including CFM56, CF34, and other popular engine types. Aviation Repair Technologies holds an exclusive lease on the test cell through 2019.
 From its headquarters at the facility, ART also manages a network of thirteen line maintenance facilities located at major airports around the United States.

The facility secured a lease with USA Floral, a major floral distributor based near Washington, D.C., that needed a southern locale for its regular flights to South America to import flowers. USA Floral was expected to create hundreds of jobs in Blytheville.

The Arkansas Archaeological Society hosted a training program at the former air base from 2004 to 2006. Archaeologists have been studying the Mississippian culture that lived in the region, focusing on the years 900–1600.

Facilities and aircraft 
It has one runway designated 18/36 with a concrete surface measuring 11,602 by 300 feet (3,536 x 92 m), with runway markings of 11,602 by 150 feet (3,536 x 46 m).

For the 12-month period ending August 31, 2009, the airport had 33,000 aircraft operations, an average of 90 per day: 58% general aviation and 42% military. At that time there were 15 aircraft based at this airport: 87% single-engine and 13% multi-engine.

The facility has  of available space, which makes it the second largest industrial complex in Arkansas. The complex consists of commercial, community, recreation, educational, garage, industrial, office, residential, and warehousing facilities, which makes it very open for many uses.

Because it was an Air Force base, it has room and facilities that are not available in many other complexes. This includes five million square feet of ramp space and six full size hangars large enough to accommodate a DC-10 or a Boeing 767. Facilities also include a full airplane maintenance and test hangar, with enough space to maintain the planes listed above.

The airport also has very reasonable seasonal climate conditions, which makes it convenient for year-round travel. The airport can accommodate up to 50 aircraft, and has large hangar and storage areas for maintenance and repair needs.

The airport also accommodates deployment and pick-up of National Guard troops, as well as training grounds for military flight training maneuvers, primarily USAF C-130 training operations from Little Rock Air Force Base, Arkansas Air National Guard A-10 training operations from Fort Smith Air National Guard Station and Arkansas Army National Guard helicopter training operations from Camp Robinson.

On October 19, 2017, it became the first airport in the state to utilize LED high intensity runway lights (HIRLs).

See also 
 Eaker Air Force Base
 Arkansas World War II Army Airfields

References

External links 
 Arkansas Aeroplex: The Arkansas International Airport
 Aerial photo as of 26 March 2001 from USGS The National Map
 

Airports in Arkansas
Transportation in Mississippi County, Arkansas
Buildings and structures in Mississippi County, Arkansas
Blytheville, Arkansas